Irene Tinker (born March 8, 1927, in Milwaukee, Wisconsin), is professor emerita in the Departments of City and Regional Planning & Women's Studies at the University of California, Berkeley, teaching from 1989 to 1998. She was the founding Board president of the International Center for Research on Women, founder and director of the Equity Policy Center and co-founder of the Wellesley Center for Research on Women.

Education 
Professor Tinker earned her B.A. from Radcliffe College in political philosophy and comparative government and her PhD from the London School of Economics and Political Science in comparative government and development.  Her dissertation was on India's first general elections and parliament after independence.

Career 
With two colleagues, she drove a Ford Anglia from London to New Delhi in 1951. In 1953, she and her new husband drove back to London from Mombasa, Kenya, in an Austin A40.  Her travelogue became a book, Crossing Centuries, published in 2010.

Tinker was appointed a United States delegate to the United Nations Commission on the Status of Women in 1973.  President Jimmy Carter appointed her assistant director of action in 1977. She was a Fulbright Scholar in Nepal and Sri Lanka from 1987 through 1989.

In 1977, Tinker became an associate of the Women's Institute for Freedom of the Press (WIFP).

Prior to UC Berkeley, she served on the faculties of Howard University, Federal City College/University of the District of Columbia, University of Maryland, and American University.  As director of the international office of the American Association for the Advancement of Science, she convened a seminar on women and international development in Mexico City in 1975 prior to the first UN International Conference on Women.

Personal life 
Tinker married Millidge Walker in 1952, with whom she has three children and five grandchildren.

Selected publications

Books

Chapters in books

Journal articles

Collection of papers 
  Pdf list of material in collection.
  Scroll down for full list of contents.

See also 
 Feminist economics
 List of feminist economists

References

External links 
 Profile page: Irene Tinker University of California, Berkeley

Living people
1927 births
Feminist economists
Radcliffe College alumni
Alumni of the London School of Economics
UC Berkeley College of Environmental Design faculty
American women writers
Women's studies academics
21st-century American women